Brandon Massie (born October 27, 1987 in Chesapeake, Virginia) is an American soccer player.

Career

Youth and College
Massie attended Hickory High School and played four years of college soccer at Virginia Wesleyan College. He finished his college career having helped to guide the Marlins to a 56-20-9 record, highlighted by three consecutive years as the No. 1 team in the final ODAC regular-season standings and three years in the ODAC championship game. He scored 57 goals, contributed 30 assists, and was a three-time Old Dominion Athletic Conference Player of the Year.

Professional
Massie signed his first professional contract with the Charleston Battery on April 7, 2010 after impressing at the Battery's invitational player trial in February. He made his professional debut on April 17, 2010 in a 3-2 win over the Charlotte Eagles.

Honors

Charleston Battery
USL Second Division Champions (1): 2010
USL Second Division Regular Season Champions (1): 2010

References

External links
 Charleston Battery bio
 Virginia Wesleyan bio

1987 births
Living people
American soccer players
Charleston Battery players
USL Second Division players
USL Championship players
Soccer players from Virginia
Association football forwards
Major Indoor Soccer League (2008–2014) players
Virginia Wesleyan Marlins men's soccer players
Sportspeople from Chesapeake, Virginia